Liparis is a large genus of snailfish from the northern hemisphere. They are very common in temperate and cold waters. Chernova (2008) has proposed that the genus should be subdivided into five subgenera: Liparis, Neoliparis, Lycocara, Careliparis, and Lyoliparis.

The generic name is from Ancient Greek λιπαρός (liparos, "oily").

Species
There are currently 60 recognized species in this genus:
 Liparis adiastolus Stein, C. E. Bond & Misitano, 2003
 Liparis agassizii Putnam, 1874
 Liparis alboventer (Krasyukova, 1984)
 Liparis antarcticus Putnam, 1874
 Liparis atlanticus (D. S. Jordan & Evermann, 1898) (Atlantic seasnail)
 Liparis barbatus Ekström (sv), 1832 (Common sea-snail)
 Liparis bikunin Matsubara & Iwai, 1954
 Liparis brashnikovi Soldatov, 1930
 Liparis bristolensis (Burke, 1912)
 Liparis burkei (D. S. Jordan & W. F. Thompson, 1914)
 Liparis callyodon (Pallas, 1814) (Spotted snailfish)
 Liparis catharus K. D. Vogt, 1973 (Purity snailfish)
 Liparis chefuensis H. W. Wu & Ki. Fu. Wang, 1933
 Liparis coheni Able, 1976 (Gulf snailfish)
 Liparis curilensis (C. H. Gilbert & Burke, 1912)
 Liparis cyclopus Günther, 1861 (Ribbon snailfish)
 Liparis dennyi D. S. Jordan & Starks, 1895 (Marbled snailfish)
 Liparis dubius Soldatov, 1930
 Liparis dulkeiti Soldatov, 1930
 Liparis eos Krasyukova, 1984
 Liparis fabricii Krøyer, 1847 (Gelatinous snailfish)
 Liparis fishelsoni J. L. B. Smith, 1967
 Liparis florae (D. S. Jordan & Starks, 1895) (Tidepool snailfish)
 Liparis frenatus (C. H. Gilbert & Burke, 1912)
 Liparis fucensis C. H. Gilbert, 1896 (Slipskin snailfish)
 Liparis gibbus T. H. Bean, 1881 (Variegated snailfish)
 Liparis grebnitzkii (P. J. Schmidt, 1904)
 Liparis greeni (D. S. Jordan & Starks, 1895) (Lobefin snailfish)
 Liparis inquilinus Able, 1973 (Inquiline snailfish)
 Liparis kusnetzovi Taranetz, 1935
 Liparis kussakini Pinchuk, 1976
 Liparis latifrons P. Y. Schmidt, 1950
 Liparis liparis (Linnaeus, 1766) (Striped seasnail)
 Liparis maculatus Krasyukova, 1984
 Liparis marmoratus P. Y. Schmidt, 1950 (Festive snailfish) 
 Liparis mednius (Soldatov, 1930)
 Liparis megacephalus (Burke, 1912)
 Liparis micraspidophorus (C. H. Gilbert & Burke, 1912)
 Liparis miostomus Matsubara & Iwai, 1954
 Liparis montagui (Donovan, 1804) (Montagu's seasnail)
 Liparis mucosus Ayres, 1855 (Slimy snailfish)
 Liparis newmani Cohen, 1960
 Liparis ochotensis P. J. Schmidt, 1904
 Liparis owstoni (D. S. Jordan & Snyder, 1904)
 Liparis petschiliensis (Rendahl (de), 1926)
 Liparis pravdini P. Y. Schmidt, 1951
 Liparis pulchellus Ayres, 1855 (Showy snailfish)
 Liparis punctatus P. Y. Schmidt, 1950
 Liparis punctulatus (S. Tanaka (I), 1916)
 Liparis rhodosoma Burke, 1930
 Liparis rotundirostris Krasyukova, 1984
 Liparis rutteri (C. H. Gilbert & Snyder, 1898) (Ringtail snailfish)
 Liparis schantarensis (Lindberg & Dulkeit, 1929) (Shantar snailfish)
 Liparis schmidti Lindberg & Krasyukova, 1987
 Liparis tanakae (C. H. Gilbert & Burke, 1912) (Tanaka's snailfish)
 Liparis tartaricus Soldatov, 1930
 Liparis tessellatus (C. H. Gilbert & Burke, 1912)
 Liparis tunicatiformis Krasyukova, 1984
 Liparis tunicatus J. C. H. Reinhardt, 1836 (Kelp snailfish)
 Liparis zonatus Chernova, Stein & Andriashev, 2004

References

External links

 
Liparidae
Taxa named by Giovanni Antonio Scopoli
Marine fish genera